Gediminas Žalalis (born 21 January 1995) is a professional Lithuanian basketball player. He plays for power forward position.

Professional career 
In 2013 Žalalis signed a 4-year contract with Lietkabelis Panevėžys. He began his first professional season in Lietkabelis, but was later loaned to BC Vilnius of the NKL and Bangenė-Aivera Panevėžys of the RKL to gain more experience. Žalalis returned to Lietkabelis in the 2014–15 season.

International career 
Žalalis previously represented five Lithuanian youth squads.

References 

Living people
1995 births
BC Dzūkija players
Lithuanian men's basketball players
Power forwards (basketball)
Basketball players from Vilnius